Basam Ridha Al-Husaini (born in Iraq c. 1964) is an advisor to Iraqi Prime Minister Nouri Maliki charged with overseeing judicial matters. He also was an advisor to his predecessor, Prime Minister Ibrahim al-Jaafari. Prior to returning to Iraq, he worked in the United States as an engineer and actor, appearing in small roles in Three Kings, 24, and Hidalgo.

Ridah is the son of a wealthy Iraqi jeweler.  His family were Shiites who refused to join Saddam Hussein's Baath Party, and as a result his older brothers Bashir and Kadhim were arrested.  Their fates were unknown until after the fall of Hussein's regime; his family found records of their execution.  Ridah fled to the US in 1982, bribing officials for a passport and dropping his last name.  He graduated with a BA in mechanical engineering in 1987 from Louisiana State University. After moving to Los Angeles, he worked as a state engineer and then started a home inspection business. A job as a cultural advisor for the film Three Kings led to an on-screen role as "Black Robe Leader", which led to parts in other Hollywood productions.

Following the fall of Saddam Hussein, Ridah returned to work for the new Iraqi government. In charge of overseeing executions, he was on vacation in Dubai and was not present for Execution of Saddam Hussein, since the US handed him over earlier than expected. Since then, he has worked to reduce the suffering of executions.

References

Leila Fadel (McClatchy Newspapers), "Iraq Getting It Right In 4th Hanging; Ex-Hollywood Actor is Chief Executioner", Pittsburgh Post-Gazette, March 21, 2007.
Rebecca Markway,  "Alumnus selected to help rebuild Iraqi homeland", The Daily Reveille (Louisiana State University), 4/23/03.
 Tina Susman, "Actor's new role: Iraqi Hangman", Los Angeles Times, July 22, 2007.

External links

Living people
1964 births
Iraqi male film actors
Iraqi emigrants to the United States
American Shia Muslims
Iraqi Shia Muslims